Lackawaxen is an unincorporated community in Lackawaxen Township, Pike County, Pennsylvania, United States. The community is located at the confluence of the Delaware and Lackawaxen Rivers, the former of which forms the state line with New York.  Lackawaxen has a post office with ZIP code 18435.

Notable person
 Ed Porray, former baseball pitcher who is the only MLB player to have been born at sea

References

Unincorporated communities in Pike County, Pennsylvania
Unincorporated communities in Pennsylvania